Dmitri Fyodorovich Egorov (December 22, 1869 – September 10, 1931) was a Russian and Soviet mathematician known for contributions to the areas of differential geometry and mathematical analysis. He was President of the Moscow Mathematical Society (1923–1930).

Life
Egorov held spiritual beliefs to be of great importance, and openly defended the Church against Marxist supporters after the Russian Revolution. He was elected president of the Moscow Mathematical Society in 1921, and became director of the Institute for Mechanics and Mathematics at Moscow State University in 1923. He also edited the journal Matematicheskii Sbornik of the Moscow Mathematical Society. However, because of Egorov's stance against the repression of the Russian Orthodox Church, he was dismissed from the Institute in 1929 and publicly rebuked. In 1930 he was arrested and imprisoned as a "religious sectarian", and soon after was expelled from the Moscow Mathematical Society. Upon imprisonment, Egorov began a hunger strike until he was taken to the prison hospital, and eventually to the house of fellow mathematician Nikolai Chebotaryov where he died. He was buried in Arskoe Cemetery in Kazan.

Research work
Egorov studied potential surfaces and triply orthogonal systems, and made contributions to the broader areas of differential geometry and integral equations. His work influenced that of Jean Gaston Darboux on differential geometry and mathematical analysis. A theorem in real analysis and integration theory, Egorov's Theorem, is named after him.

Works 
, available at Gallica.

Notes

Bibliography 
.
.

External links 

Egorov, Dmitri
Egorov, Dmitri
Egorov, Dmitri
Egorov, Dmitri
Corresponding Members of the Russian Academy of Sciences (1917–1925)
Corresponding Members of the USSR Academy of Sciences
Honorary Members of the USSR Academy of Sciences
Egorov, Dmitri
Egorov, Dmitri
Egorov, Dmitri
Egorov, Dmitri
Professorships at the Imperial Moscow University
Imperial Moscow University alumni
Burials at Arskoe Cemetery